Hongmei is a town under the jurisdiction of Dongguan prefecture-level city in the Pearl River Delta region of Guangdong province, China.

External links

Geography of Dongguan
Towns in Guangdong